Illegal defense or illegality defence may refer to:

 Illegality defence, a legal doctrine 
 Defensive three-second violation or illegal defense, in basketball

See also
 Legal defence
 Offside (association football)